Chastobovo is a rural locality (a village) in the Klimovksoye Rural Settlement, Cherepovetsky District, Vologda Oblast, Russia. The population was 40 as of 2002.

Geography 
Vasilyevskoye is the nearest rural locality.

References 

Rural localities in Cherepovetsky District